Rhys Britton (born 13 May 1999) is a British and Welsh road and track cyclist, who currently rides for UCI Continental team .

Career
He represented Wales at the 2018 Commonwealth Games, where he competed in the men's road race.

Britton became a five times British champion after winning the Points Championship at the 2019 British National Track Championships and 2020 British National Track Championships and the Scratch Championship in 2020. He had previously won both the team pursuit title and Madison title. At the 2022 British National Track Championships in Newport, Wales he won another British title after winning the team pursuit title.

Major results

2016
 1st  Madison (with Matt Walls), UEC European Junior Track Championships
2017
 1st  Madison (with Jake Stewart), National Junior Track Championships
 1st Stage 3 Driedaagse van Axel
 1st  Points classification, Junior Tour of Wales
 UEC European Junior Track Championships
2nd  Team pursuit
3rd  Individual pursuit
3rd  Madison (with Jake Stewart)
 3rd  Team pursuit, UCI Junior Track World Championships
2018
 National Track Championships
1st  Team pursuit
2nd Madison (with Ethan Vernon)
2nd Points
2nd Scratch
2019
 National Track Championships
1st  Madison (with Fred Wright)
1st  Points
2nd Team pursuit
3rd Omnium
2020
 National Track Championships
1st  Points
1st  Scratch
2nd Team pursuit
2021
 UEC European Under-23 Track Championships
1st  Madison (with Will Tidball)
2nd  Team pursuit
 3rd  Scratch, UCI Track World Championships
 3rd  Team pursuit, UEC European Track Championships
 UCI Champions League
2nd  Scratch race, Panevėžys
3rd  Scratch race, Mallorca
2022
 UCI Nations Cup
1st  Scratch race, Milton
2nd  Madison, Milton
2nd  Team pursuit, Glasgow
 1st  Team pursuit, National Track Championships
 3rd  Team pursuit, UEC European Track Championships

References

External links

1999 births
Living people
British male cyclists
British track cyclists
Welsh track cyclists
Cyclists at the 2018 Commonwealth Games
Commonwealth Games competitors for Wales
Sportspeople from Pontypridd
Cyclists at the 2022 Commonwealth Games